A saboteur is someone who commits sabotage.

Saboteur(s) or The Saboteur(s) may also refer to:

Film and television
Saboteur (film), a 1942 film directed by Alfred Hitchcock
The Saboteur: Code Name Morituri or Morituri, a 1965 American film
The Saboteurs (TV series) or The Heavy Water War, a 2015 television series

Music
The Raconteurs, known as The Saboteurs in Australia, an American rock band 
"Saboteur", a song by Amon Tobin from Supermodified
"Saboteur", a song by Jethro Tull from Under Wraps
"Saboteurs", a song by Sabaton from Coat of Arms

Video games 
Saboteur (1985 video game), an action-adventure computer game
Saboteur, an unreleased 1980s Atari 2600 game by Howard Scott Warshaw, released on Atari Flashback in 2004
The Saboteur, a 2009 video game
The Saboteur (2010 video game), a mobile tie-in to the 2009 game

Other uses
Saboteur (card game), a 2004 card game by Frederic Moyersoen
"Saboteur" (short story), a 1996 short story by Ha Jin
The Saboteur, a 2017 novel by Andrew Gross